Dominik Patrick Werling (born 13 December 1982) is a German former professional footballer who played as a left-back. His father is American and his mother is German.

Career
Werling played for several clubs in Germany before moving to Turkey. In July 2007, he joined Barnsley from Turkish side Sakaryaspor. He remained at the club until January 2008, scoring once against Plymouth Argyle, where he then signed for FC Erzgebirge Aue. On 3 September 2008, it was announced his contract had been terminated by FC Erzgebirge Aue and that he could leave the team.

Following a trial spell, in which he scored a goal in a friendly match against Blackburn Rovers, he joined Football League One side Huddersfield Town on 20 January 2009. He made his debut as a substitute for Lionel Ainsworth in the 1–0 win over Peterborough United on 31 January 2009. At the end of the season, he was not offered a new contract and was released.

On 28 April 2010, it was confirmed that Werling would be rejoining former manager Simon Davey at Darlington for the 2010–11 season. After Davey left, Werling initially stated he was committed to Darlington, but then asked for a transfer. Eventually, without having appeared for the club, he bought himself out of his contract and again rejoined Davey, now at League Two club Hereford United, where he signed a two-year deal but left in February 2011 after falling out of favour at the club. He signed in July 2014 for Swedish Div. 2 team Ånge IF.

References

External links

1982 births
Living people
German emigrants to the United States
Sportspeople from Ludwigshafen
German footballers
Footballers from Rhineland-Palatinate
Association football defenders
English Football League players
3. Liga players
1. FC Union Berlin players
Sakaryaspor footballers
Barnsley F.C. players
FC Erzgebirge Aue players
Huddersfield Town A.F.C. players
Darlington F.C. players
Hereford United F.C. players
FC 08 Homburg players
German expatriate footballers
German expatriate sportspeople in Turkey
Expatriate footballers in Turkey
German expatriate sportspeople in England
Expatriate footballers in England